Veronica repens, the Corsican speedwell or creeping speedwell, is a species of flowering plant in the family Plantaginaceae, native to Corsica and Morocco. The 'Sunshine' cultivar, whose tiny flowers are purple instead of the usual white, is recommended for rock gardens and as a ground cover.

Subspecies
The following subspecies are accepted:
Veronica repens subsp. cyanea  – Morocco
Veronica repens subsp. repens

References

repens
Flora of Morocco
Flora of Corsica
Plants described in 1805